Özgür Yasar (born 26 November 1981) is a Swedish footballer who plays as a forward.

References

External links

1981 births
Living people
Association football forwards
AFC Eskilstuna players
Syrianska FC players
Superettan players
Allsvenskan players
Swedish footballers
Vasalunds IF players
Swedish people of Turkish descent
Footballers from Gothenburg